Mauro Pezzè is an Italian computer scientist. He is a professor of the faculty of Informatics at the Università della Svizzera italiana (USI), Switzerland where he had been the Dean of the Faculty of Informatics between 2009 and 2012. He is also a professor of software engineering at the Università degli Studi di Milano-Bicocca. He has been co-chair of the International Conference on Software Engineering. Mauro is the co-author of Software testing and analysis: process, principles, and techniques published by Wiley in 2007. Since 2019 he is professor of Software Engineering at the Schaffhausen Institute of Technology. His research interests are mainly software redundancy, self-healing and self-adaptive software systems.

References

External links
 http://www.inf.usi.ch/faculty/pezze/
 

Year of birth missing (living people)
Living people
Italian computer scientists
Academic staff of the University of Lugano
Academic staff of the University of Milano-Bicocca